Jacobia may refer to:
Jacobia, Texas, unincorporated community in the United States
Jacobia, a Latin name of the town of Jakobstad, Finland
Jacobia brauni, a synonym for the jumping spider Hasarius adansoni
Jacobia, a previous illegitimate name for the fungal genus Contumyces